Ilir Hoxha (born March 31, 1949 in Tirana, Albania) is one of the sons of former Albanian leader Enver Hoxha. Ilir was imprisoned in 1995, but was released in 1996. Ilir has been called in to testify several times in an attempt to disclose secrets from the previous communist era. Ilir wrote a memoir in 1995 called "My Father, Enver Hoxha". The article recounts Ilir's memories of his father's death, the impact it had on the family, his mother's struggles, and also the investigation and prosecution that was conducted on him after his father's death.

During the 2005 election campaign in Albania, Ilir campaigned for candidates of the Party of Labour of Albania.

References

Albanian communists
Living people
1949 births
People from Tirana

Hoxhaists